Kyle Clement (born April 10, 1985) is a former American football defensive tackle. He was signed by the Pittsburgh Steelers as an undrafted free agent in 2008. He helped the Steelers win the Vince Lombardi Trophy in Super Bowl XLIII over the Arizona Cardinals. He played college football at Northwood.

Early years
Clement attended Hudsonville High School, in Hudsonville, Michigan.

College career
He played college football at Northwood University in Midland, Michigan, where he was a four-year starter and a standout defensive lineman.  He was twice named first-team all conference in the GLIAC, and was selected to participate in the Cactus Bowl after his senior season.

Professional career

Pittsburgh Steelers
Clement was signed to a 2-year deal by the Pittsburgh Steelers as an undrafted free agent following his college career. During training camp, Clement suffered a knee injury that required microfracture surgery.  He was placed on injured reserve for the remainder of the 2008 season.

Clement was a member of the Super Bowl XLIII Champion Pittsburgh Steelers.

External links
Pittsburgh Steelers bio

1985 births
Living people
People from Hudsonville, Michigan
Players of American football from Michigan
American football defensive tackles
Northwood Timberwolves football players
Pittsburgh Steelers players